Čučer-Sandevo Municipality (is a municipality in northern part of North Macedonia. Čučer-Sandevo is also the name of the village where the municipal seat is found. It is located in the Skopje Statistical Region.

Geography
The municipality borders
Kosovo to the west and north,
the City of Skopje to the south and
Lipkovo Municipality to the east.

Demographics

According to the 2021 Macedonian census, Čučer-Sandevo Municipality has 9,200 inhabitants.

Ethnic groups in the municipality:

References

External links
Official website

 
Skopje Statistical Region
Municipalities of North Macedonia